Nasrettinhoca  (former Hortu) is a small town in  Sivrihisar district of  Eskişehir Province, Turkey. The population of Nasrettinhoca was 610. as of 2012. The town is a historical settlement and it is named after Nasrettin Hoca, the famous Turkish popular philosopher and satirist of the 13th century. The town municipality claims that he was born in a historical house of the town, (now under restoration) in 1208. (However there are other claimants for Nasrettin Hoca's home like Akşehir) Like most other Central Anatolian towns, the town loses population because of migration to cities.

References 

Populated places in Eskişehir Province
Towns in Turkey
Sivrihisar District